Stephanie Georgia Manteris Tyrell (March 20, 1949 – October 27, 2003) was an American record producer, television composer, songwriter, and the wife of jazz composer, Steve Tyrell.  She produced the soundtrack albums for The Brady Bunch Movie, Mystic Pizza and the 1991 version of Father of the Bride. She was best known for writing "How Do You Talk to an Angel", the one-hit wonder from Fox's The Heights.

Tyrell died of colorectal cancer on October 27, 2003.

Discography

Soundtracks
 Midnight Crossing (1988)
 Mystic Pizza (1988)
 Getting It Right (1989)
 Gravedale High (Unknown episodes, 1990)
 California Dreams (Unknown episodes, 1992)
 The Heights (Unknown episodes, 1992)
 Family Prayers (1993)
 The Brady Bunch Movie (1995)
 A Very Brady Sequel (1996)

Theme songs
 Teen Wolf (1986–1987)
 The Famous Teddy Z (1989–1990)

Awards and nominations

References

External links

Obituary for Stephanie Tyrell (Oak Park Newspaper)

1949 births
2003 deaths
Songwriters from California
Record producers from California
American lyricists
American television composers
Women television composers
Deaths from colorectal cancer
Deaths from cancer in California
20th-century American composers
American women record producers
20th-century women composers